Nicolò Degiorgis (born 1985) is an Italian visual artist, publisher, photographer, and curator. 
He runs Rorhof, an independent publishing house in Bolzano, Italy. 
He has self-published a number of books, including Hidden Islam (2014). Hidden Islam won the First PhotoBook award at the Paris Photo–Aperture Foundation PhotoBook Awards, the Author Book Award at Rencontres d'Arles, and was a gold winner of the Deutscher Fotobuchpreis.

Early life and education
Degiorgis was born in Bolzano, South Tyrol, northern Italy.

He earned a BA in sinology from the Ca' Foscari University of Venice (2006–2008). He studied political science at the University of Trieste (2009–2010) and at Leiden University (2019).

Life and work
Hidden Islam (2014) documents the struggles of Muslims living in an Islamophobic environment in Italy between 2009 and 2013, where 1.35 million of them had only eight official mosques. Degiorgis photographed the makeshift buildings where Muslims practiced their religion and prayed. The photographs are categorised into two groups: black and white exteriors of these locations (sorted into eight types, such as warehouses, shops and supermarkets) unfold using gatefolds to present color photographs of the Muslims typically praying within half of them.

Degiorgis runs the publishing house Rorhof with his brother Michele.

Publications
Oasis Hotel. Bolzano, Italy: self-published / Rorhof, 2014. .
Hidden Islam. Bolzano, Italy: self-published / Rorhof, 2014. With an introduction by Martin Parr. . Total of 5000 copies of all editions.
Bolzano, Italy: self-published / Rorhof, 2014.
Bolzano, Italy: self-published / Rorhof, 2015.
Hidden Islam – 479 comments. Bolzano, Italy: self-published / Rorhof, 2014. . Edition of 300 copies.
Peak. Bolzano, Italy: self-published / Rorhof, 2017. .
Blue As Gold. Bolzano, Italy: self-published / Rorhof, 2017. . Edition of 350 copies.
Heimatkunde. Bolzano, Italy: self-published / Rorhof, 2017. . Edition of 750 copies.
Prison Photography. Bolzano, Italy: self-published / Rorhof, 2017. . Edition of 400 copies.
Prison Museum. Bolzano, Italy: self-published / Rorhof, 2021. . With essays by Letizia Ragaglia and Anna Rita Nuzzaci. Edition of 1000 copies.

Awards
2014: Winner, First PhotoBook award, Paris Photo–Aperture Foundation PhotoBook Awards for Hidden Islam
2014: 1 of 5 gold winners, Deutscher Fotobuchpreis 2015, for Hidden Islam
2014: Author Book Award, Rencontres d'Arles, Arles, France for Hidden Islam

Exhibitions
Hämatli & Patriæ, Bolzano, Italy, 2017

References

External links

Italian photographers
Leiden University alumni
University of Trieste alumni
Ca' Foscari University of Venice alumni
People from Bolzano
Living people
1985 births